Crookenden is a surname. Notable people with the surname include:

Ian Crookenden (born 1943), New Zealand tennis player 
Napier Crookenden (1915–2002), British Army General